Carlos Scott is a retired Bolivian-American soccer midfielder who spent two seasons in the North American Soccer League, one in the Major Indoor Soccer League and earned one cap with the U.S. national team.

Scott attended Adelphi University, where he starred on the men's soccer team in the early 1970s.  He played in fourteen games over two years with the New York Cosmos in the North American Soccer League in 1974 and 1975.  He wore number ten, but gave it up to Pelé when he signed with the Cosmos.  Scott earned his one cap with the national team in a 3-1 loss to Costa Rica on August 19, 1975.  He played one game for the Hartford Hellions during the 1979-1980 Major Indoor Soccer League season.

References

External links
 NASL/MISL stats

1952 births
Living people
Footballers from La Paz
Adelphi Panthers men's soccer players
American soccer players
Bolivian emigrants to the United States
Hartford Hellions players
Major Indoor Soccer League (1978–1992) players
New York Cosmos players
North American Soccer League (1968–1984) players
United States men's international soccer players
Association football midfielders